The African-American Film Critics Association Awards 2006, honoring the best in filmmaking of 2006, were given on December 22, 2006.

Dreamgirls, directed by Bill Condon, won four awards; including Best Picture, Best Director and the Best Supporting Acting awards (Eddie Murphy and Jennifer Hudson).

Top 10 Films
 Dreamgirls
 The Last King of Scotland
 The Departed
 Akeelah and the Bee
 Catch a Fire
 Idlewild
 Bobby
 The Devil Wears Prada
 The Pursuit of Happyness
 Inside Man

Winners
Best Actor:
Forest Whitaker - The Last King of Scotland
Best Actress:
Helen Mirren - The Queen
Best Director:
Bill Condon - Dreamgirls
Best Picture:
Dreamgirls
Best Supporting Actor:
Eddie Murphy - Dreamgirls
Best Supporting Actress:
Jennifer Hudson - Dreamgirls

References
https://web.archive.org/web/20110713062841/http://www.islandevents.com/entertainment/article_3424.shtml
http://goldderby.latimes.com/awards_goldderby/2006/12/africanamerican.html
http://www.edgeboston.com/index.php?ch=entertainment&sc=movies&sc2=news&sc3=&id=30863

2006 film awards
African-American Film Critics Association Awards